The Roman Catholic Diocese of Guasdualito is a young Latin Catholic suffragan diocese of the Metropolitan Roman Catholic Archdiocese of Mérida in Venezuela in southern Venezuela's land-locked Apure State.

Its cathedral episcopal see is the Marian Our Lady of Mount Carmel Cathedral (Catedral Nuestra Señora del Carmen) dedicated to the Virgin of Mercy, in Guasdualito, Apure.

History 
The bishopric was established on 3 December 2015 by Pope Francis as Diocese of Guasdualito, on territories split off from the dioceses of Barinas and San Fernando de Apure.

Episcopal ordinaries
Suffragan Bishops of Guasdalito
(Roman Rite)

 Pablo Modesto González Pérez, Salesians (S.D.B.) (2015.12.03 – ...)

See also
Roman Catholicism in Venezuela

References

External links 
 GCatholic 

Roman Catholic dioceses in Venezuela
Roman Catholic Ecclesiastical Province of Mérida in Venezuela
Guasdualito